Avery Moss (born September 16, 1994) is an American football outside linebacker who is a free agent. He played college football at Nebraska and Youngstown State, and was drafted by the New York Giants in the fifth round of the 2017 NFL Draft.

High school career 
Moss played high school football at Corona del Sol High School. Moss was a three-star recruit coming out of high school and committed to Nebraska to play college football.

College career 
Moss played football at Nebraska from 2012-2013 and Youngstown State from 2015-2016. Moss did not play in 2014 after being banned from Nebraska's campus for indecent exposure.

Professional career

New York Giants 
Moss was drafted by the New York Giants in the fifth round, 167th overall, in the 2017 NFL Draft.

Moss forced his first career fumble against the Seattle Seahawks on October 22, 2017.

On September 1, 2018, Moss was waived by the Giants and was signed to the practice squad the next day. He signed a reserve/future contract with the Giants on January 14, 2019.

Moss was released by the Giants on September 1, 2019, during final roster cuts.

Miami Dolphins
On September 1, 2019, Moss was claimed off waivers by the Miami Dolphins. The Dolphins waived him on July 26, 2020.

Moss was re-signed on August 27, 2020, but was waived five days later.

References

External links
 
 New York Giants bio
 Youngstown State Penguins bio

Living people
1994 births
Players of American football from Arizona
Sportspeople from Tempe, Arizona
American football outside linebackers
American football defensive ends
Nebraska Cornhuskers football players
Youngstown State Penguins football players
New York Giants players
Miami Dolphins players